The Opus Group is a group of real estate development, construction, and design companies headquartered in Minneapolis, Minnesota. The company was previously known as Rauenhorst Construction Company.

Rauenhorst was involved in the construction and engineering of Valley Fair in Shakopee, Minnesota.  Among other rides, they built the High Roller roller coaster.

Other projects include the Capella Tower in downtown Minneapolis, and the Ameriprise Financial Center.

References

External links

https://rcdb.com/6864.htm

Companies based in Minnetonka, Minnesota
Real estate companies of the United States
Construction and civil engineering companies of the United States